The Highway 55 Battle is an American college football rivalry game contested annually between the Campbellsville Tigers football team of Campbellsville University and the Lindsey Wilson Blue Raiders football team of Lindsey Wilson College.  A Highway 55 sign is the traveling trophy awarded to the annual winner in this Campbellsville-Lindsey Wilson football rivalry.

Since the rivalry began in 2010, the two teams have also been competing against each other and others as members of the Mid-South Conference.  In each season other than 2012-2014, the two teams competed in the same division of the conference.  Lindsey Wilson leads the series, 5-4, and Lindsey Wilson won the most recent contest (2018) 21-4 in Campbellsville.

History of the trophy
A Highway 55 sign was introduced as a traveling trophy for this rivalry in 2010 with the winner of the contest keeping the trophy until the following game.  The highway sign was chosen to mark the 17 miles of highway that connects the two schools.  The name was officially attached to the rivalry series in ceremonies prior to the start of the 2011 game.

Series statistics

Notable games
2013 – Lindsey Wilson 24, Campbellsville 17 – A game that started Saturday evening was finished early Sunday morning.  Serious thunderstorms halted the game for over 3 hours.  When it was finally resumed, Lindsey Wilson won their first Highway 55 Battle after losing the first three contests.

Game results

Other uses of the name
When the name Highway 55 Battle was adopted for use to refer to the football rivalry, its popularity caught on as a reference for various contests pitting Campbellsville against Lindsey Wilson.  The phrase is no longer used just to define the football rivalry.

Also, the phrase gets replaced by its counterparts, the Battle of Highway 55 or the Battle for Highway 55 just as often as the original name is used.  This inverted usage might refer to football games or any of the other uses discussed above.

References

NAIA football rivalries
Campbellsville Tigers football
Lindsey Wilson Blue Raiders football
2010 establishments in Kentucky
College football in Kentucky